Grevillea williamsonii is a shrub which is endemic to Victoria in Australia.

References

williamsonii
Flora of Victoria (Australia)
Proteales of Australia
Taxa named by Ferdinand von Mueller